Walter Camidge (2 January 1912 – July 1987), also known as William A Camidge, was an English footballer.

He played for Dringhouses, York City, Scarborough and Peterborough United.

Notes

External links
Rootsweb entry

1912 births
1987 deaths
Footballers from York
English footballers
Association football forwards
Dringhouses F.C. players
York City F.C. players
Scarborough F.C. players
Peterborough United F.C. players
English Football League players